Jean-Paul Goujon (born 1949) is a French university professor and writer.

Biography 
An honorary professor of French literature at the University of Seville, "specialist of 20th-century writers" and in particular of Pierre Louÿs, Jean-Paul Goujon is the author of several biographies and anthologies.

Publications (selection) 
 L'amitié de Pierre Louÿs et de Jean de Tinan, Pour les amis de Pierre Louÿs, 1977
 Renée Vivien à Mytilène, À l'Écart, 1978
 Renée Vivien, Œuvre poétique complète (1877–1909), Régine Deforges, 1986
 Tes blessures sont plus douces que leurs caresses. Vie de Renée Vivien, Régine Deforges, 1986
 Pierre Louÿs. Une vie secrète (1870–1925), Seghers, 1988
 Jean de Tinan, Plon, 1990 
 Léon-Paul Fargue. Poète et piéton de Paris, Éditions Gallimard, 1997 
 Dossier secret. Pierre Louÿs - Marie de Régnier, Christian Bourgois, 2002
 Mille lettres inédites de Pierre Louÿs à Georges Louis 1890-1917, Fayard, 2002
 Anthologie de la poésie érotique française, Fayard, 2004
 Ôte-moi d'un doute.
 Anthologie de la poésie érotique - Poèmes érotiques français du Moyen Age au XXe siècle, Points, 2008
 Anthologie de la poésie amoureuse française. Des trouvères à Apollinaire, Fayard, 2010
 Œuvre érotique by Pierre Louÿs, series "Bouquins", éd. Robert Laffont,  2012 .

Honours 
1998: Prix de la biographie of the Académie française for Léon-Paul Fargue. Poète et piéton de Paris.
2002: Prix Goncourt de la biographie for Pierre Louÿs. Une vie secrète (1870-1925)

References

External links 
 Jean-Paul Goujon on data.bnf.fr
 Entretien avec Jean-Paul Goujon, propos recueillis par Nathalie Jungerman, sur le site www.fondationlaposte.org
 Jean-Paul Goujon évoque l'œuvre érotique de Pierre Louÿs sur France Culture (30 May 2012)

French biographers
20th-century French writers
21st-century French writers
Prix Goncourt de la Biographie winners
1949 births
Living people